Altars is a solo studio album by American rapper Sadistik, released via Equal Vision Records on April 14, 2017. It peaked at number 13 on the Billboard Heatseekers Albums chart, as well as number 35 on the Independent Albums chart.

The cover art was painted by Michael Hussar. Music videos were created for "Free Spirits", "God Complex", "Kaleidoscope", and "Honeycomb".

Sy Shackleford of RapReviews.com named it the 6th best album of 2017.

Track listing

Charts

References

External links
 
 

2017 albums
Sadistik albums
Equal Vision Records albums